Jingshan may refer to the following locations:
The Jing Mountains, Hubei
Jingshan, Hubei, county-level city of Jingmen, Hubei
Jingshan Park, in Beijing
Beijing Jingshan School, in Beijing
Beijing–Shanhaiguan railway, or Jingshan railway, railway from Beijing to Shanhaiguan, Hebei
Subdistricts 
Jingshan Subdistrict, Wuhu, subdivision of Jinghu District, Wuhu, Anhui
Jingshan Subdistrict, Nanchang, subdivision of Qingyunpu District, Nanchang, Jiangxi
Written as "":
Jingshan Subdistrict, Beijing, subdivision of Dongcheng District, Beijing
, subdivision of Ouhai District, Wenzhou, Zhejiang

Towns
Jingshan, Jilin, subdivision of Jingyu County, Jilin
Jingshan, Hangzhou, subdivision of Yuhang District, Hangzhou, Zhejiang